Frances Sweeney (c. 1908 – June 19, 1944) was a journalist and activist who campaigned against fascism, antisemitism, and political corruption in 1940s Boston. She edited her own newspaper, the Boston City Reporter, and started the Boston Herald Rumor Clinic to combat fascist disinformation. Seeking to counteract the influence of the priest Charles Coughlin, whose antisemitic broadcasts were popular with Boston's Irish Catholics, she led protests and wrote editorials condemning the Christian Front and similar organizations. She was secretary of the American-Irish Defense Association of Boston and vice chairman of the Massachusetts Citizens' Committee for Racial Unity. A Catholic herself, Sweeney was threatened with excommunication when she criticized Cardinal William Henry O'Connell for his silence on Catholic antisemitism.

Early life

Sweeney was born in Boston around 1908. The only daughter of James Sweeney, an Irish-American saloon keeper, she grew up in the Brighton neighborhood and attended Mount Saint Joseph Academy. Little is known about her early career except that she worked for a Boston advertising agency.

Boston City Reporter

In the 1930s she founded a small muckraking newspaper, the Boston City Reporter, which she edited and mimeographed herself. Originally she focused on political corruption, but in the late 1930s she expanded its mission to fighting pro-fascist, antisemitic propaganda.

Boston, at that time, was one of the most antisemitic cities in the United States. Jewish residents, businesses, and synagogues were frequent targets of what would now be called hate crimes: gangs of mostly Irish Catholic youths, incited by Father Coughlin and the Christian Front, roamed the streets of Jewish neighborhoods, vandalizing property and assaulting residents. Many victims were seriously injured with blackjacks and brass knuckles. As columnist Nat Hentoff recalled, "Riding by Franklin Field on this trip, I remembered losing some teeth there back then to a gang of readers of Charles Coughlin's Social Justice, who recognized me as a killer of their Lord." Boston's predominately Irish police, politicians, and clergy were of little help, and the local press largely ignored the problem. Boston's popular Irish mayor, James Michael Curley, once proudly proclaimed Boston "the strongest Coughlin city in the world."

Sweeney was particularly appalled by antisemitism when it came from her fellow Irish-American Catholics. Having been subjected to religious bigotry themselves, she reasoned, they of all people ought to know better. She wrote scathing editorials condemning Coughlin, the Christian Front, and anyone else who spread antisemitic or fascist propaganda. She alerted federal agents to the activities of Francis P. Moran, leader of the Christian Front in Boston. Moran had been distributing Nazi propaganda linked to George Sylvester Viereck, and once publicly threatened to "take care of Roosevelt". Alone in a crowd of two thousand Irish Catholics in South Boston, Sweeney protested a speech by Fr. Edward Lodge Curran, a Coughlinite, and was roughly ejected from the hall to a chorus of hisses and boos. In his best-selling exposé of fascist organizations, Under Cover (1943), John Roy Carlson mentioned Sweeney as an inspiration, but likened her work in Boston to "digging at a mountain with a hand spade". According to Carlson, Sweeney's editorials led to Catholic International, a pro-fascist magazine, being banned from the city's principal newsstands. In 1943, Sweeney helped raise public awareness of widespread antisemitism in the Boston police force, eventually leading to the firing of the police commissioner followed by a sharp drop in antisemitic violence in Boston.

Many Catholics considered Sweeney anti-clerical, but she saw herself as a defender of the church against attacks from within. When she criticized Cardinal O'Connell for his silence on Catholic antisemitism, he summoned her to his office and threatened her with excommunication. Other Catholics, such as Bishop Bernard James Sheil of Chicago and Monsignor John A. Ryan of Washington, applauded her.

Boston Herald Rumor Clinic

During World War II, at Sweeney's suggestion, the Boston Herald began a "Rumor Clinic" to combat Axis propaganda and other kinds of harmful rumors: for example, it was rumored that after a woman with permed hair went to work in a munitions factory, her head exploded. Every Sunday the Herald selected a rumor, carefully tracked it to its source, and refuted it. Sweeney and others volunteered as "morale wardens", tracking down rumors and conferring with an investigative committee. Sweeney and the Rumor Clinic were featured in Reader's Digest and Life magazines, and similar clinics were started in other cities across the country.

Death and legacy

Sweeney died of rheumatic heart failure, aged 36, on June 19, 1944. She was buried at Holy Cross Cemetery in Malden, Massachusetts.

After her death, Irving Stone wrote, "Fran Sweeney could not be discouraged, could not be beaten down, could not be frightened, could not be put in her place. She was a one-man crusade. She burned with some of the hottest and most unextinguishable passion for social justice that I have ever seen."

In 1944, the Bishop Sheil School for Social Service in Chicago posthumously awarded Sweeney the Pope Leo XIII Medal "for outstanding work in combating prejudice and injustice and in advancing social education." Sweeney's mother accepted the medal on her behalf.

The Frances Sweeney Committee, an organization dedicated to fighting antisemitism, was named in her honor. The Committee was later active in combating Father Feeney, a Catholic priest who stirred up antisemitism in Boston in the 1950s.

Nat Hentoff, who worked for the Boston City Reporter as a teen, was profoundly influenced by Sweeney. His memoir, Boston Boy, is dedicated to her.

References

Citations

Bibliography

External links 
 Frances Sweeney talks with editor William Harrison – photo by Bernard Hoffman for Life magazine, 1942.
 Frances Sweeney interviews artist Giglio Dante (see also: Giglio Dante)
 Frances Sweeney interviews artist Lawrence Kupferman (see also: Lawrence Kupferman)
 Frances Sweeney talks with Aldino Felicani
 Frances Sweeney follows a lead
 Frances Sweeney interviews Tom McGowan

1900s births
1944 deaths

Year of birth uncertain
People from Boston
American people of Irish descent
American women journalists
Editors of Massachusetts newspapers
American anti-fascists
Catholics from Massachusetts
Women newspaper editors
20th-century American women
20th-century American people
Female anti-fascists